Legislative elections were held in El Salvador in January 1936, however, no results were published.

References

Bibliography
Political Handbook of the world, 1936 New York, 1937.

El Salvador
Legislative elections in El Salvador
1936 in El Salvador
Election and referendum articles with incomplete results